The Alibi (French: L'Alibi) is a 1937 French mystery film directed by Pierre Chenal and starring Erich von Stroheim, Albert Préjean and Jany Holt.

The film was shot at the Billancourt Studios and Epinay Studios in Paris. Location shooting took place at Trilport on the River Seine. The film's sets were designed by the art directors Eugène Lourié and Serge Piménoff

The film was well received by critics on its release. It was released in the United States in April 1939 by Columbia Pictures.

Cast
 Erich von Stroheim as Le professeur Winckler  
 Albert Préjean as André Laurent  
 Jany Holt as Hélène Ardouin  
 Louis Jouvet as Le commissaire Calas  
 Véra Flory as Une entraîneuse 
 Foun-Sen as L'assistante de Winckler 
 Génia Vaury as Une entraîneuse  
 Made Siamé as La secrétaire de Calas 
 Roger Blin as Kretz, l'homme de main de Winckler  
 Philippe Richard as John Gordon  
 Jean Témerson as Jojo, l'ami de Dany 
 Maurice Baquet as Gérard  
 Pierre Labry as Le premier inspecteur  
 Max Dalban as Le second inspecteur  
 Florence Marly as La maitresse de Gordon  
 Margo Lion as Dany  
 Bobby Martin as Le chef d'orchestre de jazz  
 Thelma Minor as La chanteuse de l'orchestre 
 Jacques Beauvais as Le maître d'hôtel 
 Albert Brouett as L'huissier  
 Paul Delauzac as L'avocat  
 Fernand Flament as Un inspecteur  
 Henry Houry as L'Américain  
 Paul Marthès as Le gros dandy  
 Laura Marvel as La danseuse  
 Marcel Melrac as Un agent  
 Monique Rolland as Une entraîneuse  
 Odette Talazac as La logeuse  
 Bobby Waisberg as Le petit fleuriste  
 René Worms as Le patron de Calas

References

Bibliography
 Andrews, Dudley. Mists of Regret: Culture and Sensibility in Classic French Film. Princeton University Press, 1995.

External links

1937 films
Films set in Paris
1937 mystery films
Films directed by Pierre Chenal
1930s French-language films
Columbia Pictures films
French mystery films
Films shot at Billancourt Studios
Films shot at Epinay Studios
French black-and-white films
1930s French films